Harford County Airport  is a public airport located in the unincorporated community of Churchville, in Harford County, Maryland, United States.

Harford County Airport is a general aviation (GA) airport in northern Maryland that serves primarily recreational pilots. There used to be three runways at Harford, two turf/grass runways 01/19 and 14/32, as well as one paved/asphalt runway 10/28. As part of a major expansion project, in September of 2018, the turf runway 14/32 was permanently closed to make room for a paved parking area and new hangars. At the same time, runway 01/19 was closed to be paved and extended from 2000 feet to 2856 feet. In April of 2020, the new runway 01/19 opened to traffic.

The airport has a large sailplane/glider contingent and hosts some commercial flying activities, mainly sightseeing and flight training.

Airport upgrades 
The airport is currently obtaining permits to enable a generalized expansion. This expansion is aimed at increasing the overall safety of the airport and to attract new business into the surrounding area. The airport expansion will consist of eliminating two of the three existing runways and extending the length of one of its runways to just over 3,000 feet. This will allow aircraft to arrive and depart on a safer longer runway, while simultaneously reducing noise for the surrounding community. This expansion will also promote increased business revenue for many of the shops and restaurants in Bel Air, Churchville, Aberdeen, and Edgewood, and will serve as convenient access to those visiting the Aberdeen Proving Grounds.

On April 14, 2015, a judge ruled against a zoning appeal to stop the airport expansion.

References 

Airports in Maryland
Transportation buildings and structures in Harford County, Maryland